Frozen Television was a television production company specializing in documentaries and entertainment programming. Frozen Television was founded by Burt Kearns and Brett Hudson and was affiliated with the motion picture production company, Frozen Pictures.

It closed in 2012. Kearns now runs productions through his Good Story Productions.

Projects

Adults Only: The Secret History of The Other Hollywood for Court TV
The Secret History of Rock 'n' Roll with Gene Simmons for Court TV
All The Presidents' Movies with Martin Sheen for Bravo 
My First Time for Showtime

References

Television production companies of the United States